Whistley Green is a village in Berkshire, England, and part of the civil parish of St Nicholas Hurst.

Villages in Berkshire
Borough of Wokingham